Carolina Dementiev Justavino (born 1 February 1989) is a Panamanian model, TV host, ironman and beauty pageant contestant winner of the Miss Panama pageant. She also represented Panama in the 57th Miss Universe 2008, held at the Diamond Bay Resort in Nha Trang, Vietnam.

Modelling career
Her start in the modeling world took place when she joined the "Chica Modelo" (a model search) contest in 2004 where she won to his 17 years. It also gave her the chance to work for Physical Modelos, her official modeling agency as of today. As model, Justavino taken part in calendars, commercial and as stewardess in different events..

She is a professional model, law student, as well as a TV host and is also an avid swimmer, as well as the winner of a silver medal in a regional swimming competition, where she represented Panama. Justavino also owns a real estate business, which she has hopes expanding one day. She is quoted on the topic, “I own a small real estate business which I'd love to see grow, while promoting Panama's excellent geographical location.”.

Realmente Bella Señorita Panamá 2008
In 2008, she joined the Realmente Bella Señorita Panamá pageant, where she won the title of Miss Panama Universe, which gave her the opportunity to compete in Miss Universe 2008.

IRONMAN
Now she is devoting to be won IronMan where different skills.
In 2012 she won the award for "Triathlete of the Year" in Cable Onda Sports Awards Ceremony, 2012.

She is World Champion IRONMAN 2013 in Las Vegas

Doping 
In 2016, she was suspended during 24 months for use cream with dopant by WADA (World Anti-Doping Agency).

Brand ambassador 
Currently, Carolina is the Brand Ambassador of Panama Blue, Panamas premium bottled water.

TV host
Started in the world of television with Entorno Urbano. Later joined the TV show Al Descubierto in TVN PANAMÁ, where she is one of the principal host in this TV show. She actually hosts the morning show "Jelou"in TVN PANAMÁ.

References

External links

Miss Universe 2008 contestants
1989 births
Living people
Panamanian people of Russian descent
Señorita Panamá
Panamanian beauty pageant winners
People from Panama City
Russian emigrants to Panama